Craugastor cruzi is a species of frog in the family Craugastoridae.
It is endemic to Honduras.
Its natural habitats are subtropical or tropical moist montane forests and intermittent rivers.

References

Sources
 

cruzi
Endemic fauna of Honduras
Amphibians described in 1989
Taxonomy articles created by Polbot